Grypotes is a genus of leafhoppers.

References 

Cicadellidae genera
Deltocephalinae